The following is the list of 222 paintings indexed as autograph by Frans Hals, written by the art historian and Hals specialist Seymour Slive in 1974. The list is by catalogue number and is more or less in order of creation, starting from around 1610 when Hals began painting on his own. Most of these works are still considered autograph, but in the intervening half-century since Slive's work began, several others have been added to the list, including a few from Slive's "L" list of 20 lost paintings and a few from his "D" list of 81 doubtful attributions. In addition to these 101 rejections, Slive occasionally mentions other engravings and paintings in various catalogue entries, including as much provenance as possible, which has enabled scholars to make a few attributions based on those as well. The full number of paintings referenced in the Slive 1974 catalogue, whether by catalogue entry, illustration, or publication reference, is over 400. The autograph catalogue entries are as follows:

See also
 Marriage pendant portraits by Frans Hals – a list showing the marriage pendants side-by-side
 List of paintings by Frans Hals – updated (but still incomplete) list

Sources

 Frans Hals, by Seymour Slive, a catalogue raisonné of Hals works by Seymour Slive: Volume Three, the catalogue, National Gallery of Art: Kress Foundation, Studies in the History of European Art, London: Phaidon Press, 1974
 Frans Hals, by Seymour Slive (editor), with contributions by Pieter Biesboer, Martin Bijl, Karin Groen and Ella Hendriks, Michael Hoyle, Frances S. Jowell, Koos Levy-van Halm and Liesbeth Abraham, Bianca M. Du Mortier, Irene van Thiel-Stroman,  Prestel-Verlag, Munich & Mercatorfonds, Antwerp, 1989, 
Frans Hals: het gehele oeuvre, by Claus Grimm, Amsterdam, Meulenhoff/Landshoff, 1990
 Frans Hals in the RKD

 List
Hals, Frans